Ride was the first album released by the band Jo Hikk. It was released by Landis Productions Ltd. in 2009. The album includes the hit singles "Sweet City Woman" and "My Kind of Radio." "Closer" was previously recorded by Thrasher Shiver on its self-titled debut and "It's Only Monday" was previously a single for Brice Long in 2005.

Track listing 
"Ride" – 3:01
"Scarecrow" – 4:04
"West Texas Crude" – 3:44
"Pimp My Tractor" – 3:27
"Shame on the Moon" – 3:55
"Sweet City Woman" – 3:18
"Dancing with the Devils" – 4:14
"Suck It Up" – 4:09
"My Kind of Radio" – 4:00
"It's Only Monday" – 3:51
"Closer" – 3:43

Personnel 
 Kenny Sitter - guitar, backing vocals, banjo
 Don Jorgensen - keyboards, mandolin
 Kelly Sitter - bass, lead vocals
 Al Doell - drums, backing vocals

References
[ Ride] at allmusic
Ride at Country Music News

2009 albums
Jo Hikk albums